Praia do Norte (‘North Beach’) is a beach located in Nazaré, Portugal, which due to its giant white breaking waves is famed for its surfing conditions. Nazaré's waves were listed on the Guinness Book of Records for the biggest waves ever surfed.

Overview
Praia do Norte’s very high breaking waves form due to the presence of the underwater Nazaré Canyon. The canyon creates constructive interference between incoming swell waves which tends to make the waves much larger.

In November 2011, surfer Garrett McNamara, who resides in Hawai'i, surfed a record-breaking giant wave:  from trough to crest, at Praia do Norte in Nazaré, Portugal. On 28 January 2013, McNamara returned to the spot and successfully surfed a wave that appeared even larger, but is awaiting an official measurement as of November 2018.

On November 8, 2017, Brazilian surfer Rodrigo Koxa broke the previous record surfing an  wave at Praia do Norte which was captured in a video that went viral over social media.

See also 
 List of beaches in Portugal
 Supertubos
 List of surfing records

References

External links 

 Praia do Norte, Nazaré – Live Beachcam (Southern view)
 Praia do Norte, Nazaré – Live Beachcam (Northern view)

Beaches of Portugal
Surfing locations in Portugal